Park Ye-young (born August 22, 1989) is a South Korean actress. After graduated Film Department of Konkuk University College of Arts and Design, Park began acting in 2013, and has since starred in several independent short and feature films. She is also known for her supporting role in Netflix Original Series Hometown Cha-Cha-Cha, Coupang play original Anna, and Summer Strike.

Early years and education 
In her childhood, Park saw a theater performance and vaguely curious about acting. However, She only seriously interested in acting in middle school. Due to influence of a teacher, Park enrolled a theater class for a one semester until She transferred school the middle of the school year. In high school, Park, suddenly wanted to try acting again and try to persuade her parents. To pursue her dream, She enrolled and studied in Film Department of Konkuk University College of Arts and Design.

Career

Debut and career in independent film 
Park began her acting career in the short film Winter Preparation (2013) as Jae-in. Directed by Lee Yoon-hyeong, it was premiered in 12th Mise-en-scène Short Film Festival. It was also screened in the 14th Daegu Short Film Festival. Those were Park's first and second experience in attending film festival. In the same year, Park starred in short film Shorts, which was screened in 2013 Seoul Independent Film Festival. In 2015, another short film starring Park, And Autumn Has Come was invited to Mise-en-scène Short Film Festival and Jeonbuk Independent Film Festival. A year later, her short film The Road not Taken also known as Galae (2016) was screened in Seoul International Women's Film Festival and invited to Seoul International Youth Film Festival."Park Ye-young is a strange actress. In the film, Park Ye-young often looks at the other person obliquely, at an angle that is somewhat difficult to explain, at an unexpected timing. Since film is an art of the gaze, it evokes the feeling that the entire screen is tilted every time, some kind of brute force. I have no choice but to say this. That's because only Park Ye-young creates that kind of feeling. At first, I thought it was the directing, but it was strange to see such power always exerted in different directors' films. I want to see that power more often. Maybe this actress will get stronger and stronger." Jeong Seong-il, director and film critic.In 2017, Park was selected as featured actress of "10th FILM DABIN Project: Actress Park Ye-young." The project screened her three independent film, And Autumn Has Come, My Chemical Love, and Shall We Go and held two discussion events with Park. The discussion was moderated by Director Hyung Seul-woo, and part of panel were Director Choi Jeong-ho, Moon In-su and Director Lee Yu-ri. It were held on Saturday, November 11th at Seoul Theater 8, 13, Jongno-gu, Seoul and Saturday, November 18th at Pause Cinema, Chuncheon-si, Gangwon-do.

Television debut and recent projects 
Park television debut was in a small role as nurse for tvN drama series Abyss (2019). A year later Park appeared in episode 22 and 23 of drama series Soul Mechanic as nurse Heo Min-young. In 2021, Park starred as Lee Sung-sil in episode 6 of SBS drama Sell Your Haunted House. That same year, Park acted in her first supporting role as variety show writer Wang Ji-won in drama series Hometown Cha-Cha-Cha. In the same year, Park made a brief cameo appearance in film Emergency Declaration and drama series Reflection of You. Then she appeared in episode 1st, 2nd and 4th of Inspector Koo, playing Yoon Jae-young.

In 2022, Park starred alongside Bae Suzy in Coupang Play original series Anna, as Anna's best friend Ji-won. Her performance gained critical acclaim and earned her New Actress Award for Series in 2023 Director's Cut Awards. Also in 2022, Park back to independent film with titular role in Jung Hae-il's film Joo-young in Wonderland. The film was screened in The 16th Evergreen Digilog World Film Festival where the director Jung Hae-il won Special Award. 

Park is affiliated to artist management Dongyi Company since July 2022. In March 2023, Park signed with new agency C-JeS Entertainment.

Filmography

Feature film

Short film

Television series

Web series

Awards and nominations

Listicles

References

External links 
 
 

Living people
1988 births
South Korean film actresses
South Korean television actresses
South Korean web series actresses
21st-century South Korean actresses